Blindspot is the fourth album by Dan Michaelson  Dan Michaelson and The Coastguards and was released in March 2013 by the London independent label The State 51.

Track listing

References

2013 albums